The turbot (Scophthalmus maximus) is a relatively large species of flatfish in the family Scophthalmidae. It is a demersal fish native to marine or brackish waters of the Northeast Atlantic, Baltic Sea and the Mediterranean Sea. It is an important food fish. Turbot in the Black Sea have often been included in this species, but are now generally regarded as separate, the Black Sea turbot or kalkan (S. maeoticus). True turbot are not found in the Northwest Atlantic; the "turbot" of that region, which was involved in the so-called "Turbot War" between Canada and Spain, is the Greenland halibut or Greenland turbot (Reinhardtius hippoglossoides).

Etymology

The word comes from the Old French , which may be a derivative of the Latin  ('spinning top') a possible reference to its shape. Another possible origin of the Old French word is from Old Swedish , from  'thorn' +  'stump, butt, flatfish', which may also be a reference to its shape (compare native English halibut). Early reference to the turbot can be found in a satirical poem (The Emperor's Fish) by Juvenal, a Roman poet of the late 1st and early 2nd centuries AD, suggesting this fish was a delicacy in the Roman empire.

In English, turbot is pronounced  .

Description
The turbot is a large left eyed flatfish found primarily close to shore in sandy shallow waters throughout the Mediterranean, the Baltic Sea, the Black Sea, and the North Atlantic.

Fisheries
Turbot is highly prized as a food fish for its delicate flavour, and is also known as brat, breet, britt, or butt. It is a valuable commercial species, acquired through aquaculture and trawling. Turbot are farmed in Bulgaria, Canada, France, Spain, Portugal, Romania, Turkey, Chile, Norway, and China.
Turbot has a bright white flesh that retains this appearance when cooked. Like all flatfish, turbot yields four fillets with meatier topside portions that may be baked, poached, steamed, or pan-fried.

References

External links

 
 

Scophthalmus
Commercial fish
Marine fish of Europe
Fish of the Mediterranean Sea
Fish described in 1758
Taxa named by Carl Linnaeus